Mario Mazzoni (29 March 1931 – 17 May 2019) was a former Italian professional footballer and manager who played as a midfielder.

In 2014, he was inducted into ACF Fiorentina Hall of Fame.

Career

Player
In his  youth, Mazzoni played for Fiorentina, before playing for several other Tuscan teams such as Le Signe, Siena, and Empoli.

After one season at Ascoli, he was bought by Bari for the 1953–54 IV Serie, where he spent most of his career, becoming the captain and reaching Serie A in 1958. At Bari, he made a total of 313 appearances and scored 25 goals (of which 90 appearances and 7 goals in Serie A), becoming the third player with most appearances in the club's history.

He then spent one season at Prato during the 1963–64 Serie B, before ending his career at Poggibonsi after the 1964–65 Serie D season.

Manager
In 1970, Mazzoni was appointed as assistant coach of Fiorentina. At the end of the 1974–75 season, he replaced Nereo Rocco, who had quit his role of first team coach, leading the club to the victory of the 1974–75 Coppa Italia. He also led Siena during the 1978–79 Serie C2.

Honours

Player
Bari
IV Serie: 1953–54
Serie C: 1954–55

Manager
Fiorentina
Coppa Italia: 1974–75

Individual 
ACF Fiorentina Hall of Fame: 2014

References

External links
 Mario Mazzoni at Enciclopediadelcalcio.it
 

1931 births
2019 deaths
Italian footballers
Association football midfielders
ACF Fiorentina players
Empoli F.C. players
S.S.C. Bari players
Italian football managers
ACF Fiorentina managers
A.C.N. Siena 1904 managers